Wierzchowice may refer to the following places in Poland:
Wierzchowice in Gmina Wądroże Wielkie, Jawor County in Lower Silesian Voivodeship (SW Poland)
Wierzchowice in Gmina Krośnice, Milicz County in Lower Silesian Voivodeship (SW Poland)
Wierzchowice in Gmina Gaworzyce, Polkowice County in Lower Silesian Voivodeship (SW Poland)